Ciara Conway (born 13 August 1980) is a former Irish Labour Party politician who served as a Teachta Dála (TD) for the Waterford constituency from 2011 to 2016.

She attended NUI Galway. She is married to Gary Honer.

A former member of Dungarvan Town Council, she was first elected to the council at the 2009 local elections.

Conway seconded the nomination, upon Simon Harris moving it, of Enda Kenny as Taoiseach on the first sitting of the 31st Dáil.

Conway lost her seat at the 2016 general election.

References

External links
Conway's page on the Labour Party website

 

1980 births
Living people
Alumni of the University of Galway
Labour Party (Ireland) TDs
Local councillors in County Waterford
Members of the 31st Dáil
Politicians from County Waterford
Alumni of Waterford Institute of Technology
21st-century women Teachtaí Dála